The Tamazula River is a river in the state of Sinaloa, Mexico, originating in the Sierra Madre Occidental mountains, flowing westward towards the Pacific Ocean. The Tamazula receives the Humaya River in the city of Culiacán to form the Culiacán River. 

The river is dammed at Sanalona, Sinaloa creating a large reservoir. 

Rivers of the Sierra Madre Occidental
Rivers of Sinaloa